The M3 Amphibious Rig is a self-propelled, amphibious bridging vehicle that is used for the projection of tanks and other vehicles across water obstacles.

Development and service
Originally developed by the German firm Eisenwerke Kaiserslautern (EWK, since 2002 acquired by General Dynamics European Land Systems), it succeeded the conceptually similar M2 made by the same company. Like its predecessor, the M3 traverses roads on its four wheels, deploying two large aluminium pontoons for buoyancy on water.

Development of the M3 began in 1982, with the final prototype being delivered 10 years later in 1992. A first order of 64 serial vehicles was made in 1994, and it entered service with the German and British armies in 1996. Since then, the M3 has also been adopted by the armies of the Republic of China (Taiwan) and Singapore.

An upgraded version, known in some circles as the M3G Military Float Bridge/Raft, is in service with the ROC  and Singapore armies,  features an armoured cabin, NBC protection, an air conditioning system and a special tropical kit.

GDELS and Hanwha Defence will jointly manufacture 110 M3K vehicles for the Republic of Korea Army’s KABV requirement.

Operating concept
The M3 is self-deployable by road, operating as a 4x4 wheeled vehicle with a maximum road speed of 80 km/h. Before it is driven into the water for amphibious operation, two large aluminium pontoons are deployed, unfolding them along the length of its hull.  The crew exits the vehicle cab to maneuver the pontoon using controls located on top of the hull. In water, the M3 is propelled and steered by 2 fully traversable pump jets at speeds of up to 14 km/h.

Multiple rigs may be joined by long connectors called "ramps", 4 of which are carried on each vehicle, to form a bridge across a water obstacle. 8 M3 Rigs will bridge a 100m water gap this way, and can be traversed by vehicles up to and including the heaviest 60+ ton main battle tank like the Leopard 2A6 and Challenger 2. Alternatively, just 2 Rigs may be joined to create a ferry capable of carrying a similar load across much wider water gaps. 3 Rigs joined together may carry up to the equivalent of 2 such MBTs.

Combat history

Operation Telic
The M3 Amphibious Bridging Vehicle saw its first combat actions in Operation Telic, Britain's military operations in the Iraq War (until withdrawal in 2011). From 25 March 2003, 23 Amphibious Engineer Squadron, of 28 Engineer Regiment of the Royal Engineers ferried elements of 3 Commando Brigade across the Shatt Al-Basrah waterway, enabling their continued advance on the Iraqi city of Basra. A subsequent riverine crossing at the Rumaila oil fields was also undertaken by the M3. This action transported three AS90 self-propelled howitzers in support of 16 Air Assault Brigade of the British Army.

Operators

 - German Army (operators have included Pionierbataillon 140 at Emmerich; now remains with 130th Armored Engineer Battalion (Panzerpionierbataillon 130)), 30 vehicles in service 
 - Indonesian Army
 - Republic of China Army
 - Singapore Army
 - British Army, 10 vehicles in service 
 - Brazilian Army
 - South Korean Army
 - Latvian Army
 - Swedish Army, 12 vehicles to be delivered from 2024

See also
 M104 Wolverine
 M60 AVLB
 M1074 Joint Assault Bridge

References

External links

General Dynamics European Land Systems - M3 Amphibian

Military engineering vehicles
Military bridging equipment
Amphibious military vehicles
Cold War military vehicles of Germany
Military vehicles introduced in the 1990s
Portable bridges